Sweet Derriere (German: Die Kleine mit dem süßen Po) is a 1975 Austrian sex comedy film directed by Georg Tressler and starring Werner Ploner, Gustav Schneller and Lydia Mikulski. The film's sets were designed by the art director Nino Borghi.

Cast
 Werner Ploner as Picheldorfer 
 Gustav Schneller as Spanner 
 Lydia Mikulski as Muschi 
 Monika Sebek as Angela 
 Sonja Sitar as Birgit 
 Heinz Holden as Thomas 
 Annemarie Schüler as Tatjana 
 Elfriede Gerstl as Dr. Küssnacht 
 Renée Felden as Frau Kellermann 
 Christian Schratt as Michael 
 Franz Waldeck as Oberförster 
 Harald Serafin
 Karl Krittl as Pfarrer 
 Johann Sklenka as Wassermann 
 Fritz Goblirsch as Kellermann 
 Gerti Schneider as Claudia 
 Margit Schwarzer as Petra

References

Bibliography 
 Robert von Dassanowsky. Austrian Cinema: A History. McFarland, 2005.

External links 
 

1975 films
1970s sex comedy films
Austrian sex comedy films
1970s German-language films
Films directed by Georg Tressler
1975 comedy films